The 1942 Keighley by-election was held on 13 February 1942.  The by-election was held due to the death of the incumbent Labour MP, Hastings Lees-Smith.  It was won (unopposed) by the Labour candidate Ivor Thomas.

References

1942 in England
By-elections to the Parliament of the United Kingdom in Bradford constituencies
Keighley
1942 elections in the United Kingdom
Unopposed by-elections to the Parliament of the United Kingdom (need citation)
1940s in Yorkshire